Cadlina flavomaculata, common name the yellow-spot cadlina, is a species of colourful sea slug, a dorid nudibranch, a shell-less marine gastropod mollusk in the family Cadlinidae.

Distribution 
Cadlina flavomaculata is a relatively rare nudibranch found in subtidal and intertidal zones of the northeastern Pacific, from Vancouver Island to the southern tip of Baja California. However, it is common  in some diving sites between Monterey, Carmel and Big Sur.

Description 
The yellow-spot cadlina is charactered by its ovate, translucent, white mantle with distinctive, brown to  black rhinophores. A series of large, yellow spots (mantle glands) can be seen on each side of the mantle.  Some reported specimens also show a yellow border to the mantle, but this is not found in all individuals. The color of branchia (gills) is white to yellow. Its reported length is 15 mm.

Ecology 

Cadlina flavomaculata feeds on the sponge Aplysilla glacialis.

References 

Cadlinidae
Gastropods described in 1905